The Sociedad Gimnástica Española was a football club based in San José, Costa Rica.

History
Founded in 1911, Sociedad Gimnástica Española debuted in the Primera División de Costa Rica on 17 July 1921 against Gimnástica Limonense and played 39 seasons  at the top level until their final season in 1961, when they were relegated after the ASOFUTBOL league split.

In 2007, Spanish native Ceferino Casero started a project to revive the club for the Spanish community in Costa Rica.

Honours
Costa Rican Primera División (Runner-up): 1921, 1928, 1930, 1933, 1937, 1938, 1942.

References

Football clubs in San José, Costa Rica
Defunct football clubs in Costa Rica
Association football clubs established in 1911
1911 establishments in Costa Rica